Harsh Yadav (born 31 May 1961) is ex. Cabinet Minister of Cottage & Rural Industries, New Renewable Energy of Madhya Pradesh and the Member of Legislative Assembly from Deori Vidhan Sabha in Madhya Pradesh. He is the member of the INC.

Political career
He was the chairman of Janpad Panchayat Deori from 2000 to 2005. He also held various posts in Yadav Mahasabha such as vice-president and district president.
He became an MLA in 2013 for the first time from Deori. He also won in 2018 Vidhansabha election for second term.
On 25 December 2018 he took oath as Cabinet minister in Madhya Pradesh Government headed by C.M Shri Kamalnath.

See also
Madhya Pradesh Legislative Assembly
2013 Madhya Pradesh Legislative Assembly election

References

1961 births
Living people
Indian National Congress politicians from Madhya Pradesh
Madhya Pradesh MLAs 2013–2018
Madhya Pradesh MLAs 2018–2023